Samuel Grove Price (17 June 1793 – 17 June 1839) was a British barrister and Tory politician. He was twice Member of Parliament for Sandwich from 1830 to 1831 and from 1835 to 1837.

References 

 

1793 births
1839 deaths
Conservative Party (UK) MPs for English constituencies
Alumni of Trinity College, Cambridge
Fellows of Downing College, Cambridge
Members of Lincoln's Inn
Members of Gray's Inn
Members of the Parliament of the United Kingdom for English constituencies
People educated at Eton College
English barristers